Clément Jérôme Michelin (born 11 May 1997) is a French professional footballer who plays as a right-back for Ligue 2 club Girondins de Bordeaux on loan from AEK Athens. He has also represented the France national youth teams starting from the France national under-17 football team.

Career

Toulouse
Michelin made his debut for Ligue 1 side Toulouse on 20 September 2016 against Lille, replacing Issiaga Sylla after 61 minutes in a 2–1 away win.

Lens
On 11 June 2019, Michelin signed a three-year contract with French club Lens.

AEK Athens
On 5 August 2021, Michelin signed a four-year contract with Greek club AEK Athens.

Career statistics

Honours
France U19
UEFA European Under-19 Championship: 2016

References

External links

1997 births
Living people
People from Montauban
French footballers
France youth international footballers
Association football defenders
Toulouse FC players
AC Ajaccio players
RC Lens players
Ligue 1 players
Ligue 2 players
Championnat National 3 players
Olympic footballers of France
Footballers at the 2020 Summer Olympics
Sportspeople from Tarn-et-Garonne
Expatriate footballers in Greece
French expatriate sportspeople in Greece
French expatriate footballers
Super League Greece players
AEK Athens F.C. players
FC Girondins de Bordeaux players
Footballers from Occitania (administrative region)